Vilufushi (Dhivehi: ވިލުފުށި) is an inhabited island in Maldives.

History
The island was very highly impacted by the 2004 tsunami, and the entire population was displaced to other islands. The government then took the opportunity to expand the area of the island with a land reclamation scheme and the population was returned to the island in 2009. With the help of foreign aid, new facilities were built, and fundamental needs provided for residents.

Geography
Vilufushi belongs to the North Central province of the Maldives, according to government documents. It was also named Thaa Atoll, an administrative constituency.

Demography

Economy
Vilufushi is known for the various kinds of fishing available. Facilities have been rebuilt with the help of foreign aid, following the 2004 tsunami.

References

Islands of the Maldives